Li Yun-hae (born 3 September 1940) is a North Korean former sports shooter. He competed in three events at the 1972 Summer Olympics.

References

1940 births
Living people
North Korean male sport shooters
Olympic shooters of North Korea
Shooters at the 1972 Summer Olympics
Place of birth missing (living people)
Asian Games medalists in shooting
Shooters at the 1974 Asian Games
Asian Games gold medalists for North Korea
Asian Games silver medalists for North Korea
Medalists at the 1974 Asian Games
20th-century North Korean people